Shankar Roy is a Bangladeshi musician and writer. In recognition of his contribution to music, the government of Bangladesh awarded him  the country's second highest civilian award Ekushey Padak in 2020.

Books
Some of his books on music includes:
 Shreshtha Sangeet Songroho
 Rabindra Sangeet Swaralipi
 Shreshtha Sangeet Swaralipi
 Shersto Adhunik Ganer Swaralipi
 Prathomik Ragmala
 rag Minoti

References 

Living people
Recipients of the Ekushey Padak
Year of birth missing (living people)